West Neck Road Historic District is a national historic district located at Huntington in Suffolk County, New York.  The district has 26 contributing buildings.  It is a large, intact residential enclave with dwellings dating from the mid-18th to early 20th centuries.

It was added to the National Register of Historic Places in 1985.

References

External links
West Neck Road Historic District (Living Places)

National Register of Historic Places in Huntington (town), New York
Historic districts on the National Register of Historic Places in New York (state)
Federal architecture in New York (state)
Gothic Revival architecture in New York (state)
Historic districts in Suffolk County, New York